Mocímboa da Praia District is a district of Cabo Delgado Province in northern Mozambique. The district capital is Mocímboa da Praia town.

External links

Districts in Cabo Delgado Province